Howmeh Rural District may refer to:
 Howmeh Rural District (Bushehr County), in Bushehr province
 Howmeh Rural District (Dashtestan County), in Bushehr province
 Howmeh Rural District (Deylam County), in Bushehr province
 Howmeh Rural District (Deyr County), in Bushehr province
 Howmeh Rural District (Kangan County), in Bushehr province
 Howmeh Rural District (Borujen County), in Chaharmahal and Bakhtiari province
 Howmeh Rural District (Shahrekord County), in Chaharmahal and Bakhtiari province
 Howmeh Rural District (Sarab County), in East Azerbaijan province
 Howmeh Rural District (Lamerd County), in Fars province
 Howmeh Rural District (Larestan County), in Fars province
 Howmeh Rural District (Masal County), in Gilan province
 Howmeh Rural District (Rasht County), in Gilan province
 Howmeh Rural District (Bandar Lengeh County), in Hormozgan province
 Howmeh Rural District (Minab County), in Hormozgan province
 Howmeh Rural District (Qeshm County), in Hormozgan province
 Howmeh Rural District (Bam County), in Kerman province
 Howmeh Rural District (Kahnuj County), in Kerman province
 Howmeh Rural District (Gilan-e Gharb County), in Kermanshah province
 Howmeh Rural District (Harsin County), in Kermanshah province
 Howmeh Rural District (Andimeshk County), in Khuzestan province
 Howmeh Rural District (Behbahan County), in Khuzestan province
 Howmeh Rural District (Haftgel County), in Khuzestan province
 Howmeh Rural District (Bijar County), in Kurdistan province
 Howmeh Rural District (Divandarreh County), in Kurdistan province
 Howmeh Rural District (Sanandaj County), in Kurdistan province
 Howmeh Rural District (Maneh and Samalqan County), in North Khorasan province
 Howmeh Rural District (Shirvan County), in North Khorasan province
 Howmeh Rural District (Gonabad County), in Razavi Khorasan province
 Howmeh Rural District (Khalilabad County), in Razavi Khorasan province
 Howmeh Rural District (Mahvelat County), in Razavi Khorasan province
 Howmeh Rural District (Damghan County), in Semnan province
 Howmeh Rural District (Garmsar County), in Semnan province
 Howmeh Rural District (Semnan County), in Semnan province
 Howmeh Rural District (Shahrud County), in Semnan province
 Howmeh Rural District (Iranshahr County), in Sistan and Baluchestan province
 Howmeh Rural District (Saravan County), in Sistan and Baluchestan province
 Howmeh Rural District (South Khorasan Province)
 Howmeh Rural District (Abhar County), in Zanjan province
 Howmeh Rural District (Khodabandeh County), in Zanjan province

See also
 Howmeh-ye Dehgolan Rural District
 Howmeh-ye Gharbi Rural District (disambiguation)
 Howmeh-ye Sharqi Rural District (disambiguation)
 Howmeh-ye Jonubi Rural District
 Howmeh-ye Kerend Rural District
 Howmeh-ye Shomali Rural District